John O'Keefe (1827 – 10 June 1877) was an Irish Home Rule League politician.

He sat as Home Rule Member of Parliament (MP) for Dungarvan in 1874 until his death at age 49 in 1877.

References

External links
 

UK MPs 1874–1880
1827 births
1877 deaths
Home Rule League MPs
Members of the Parliament of the United Kingdom for County Waterford constituencies (1801–1922)